Laser-assisted new attachment procedure (LANAP) is a surgical therapy for the treatment of periodontitis, intended to work through regeneration rather than resection. This therapy and the laser used to perform it have been in use since 1994. It was developed by Robert H. Gregg II and Delwin McCarthy.

In LANAP surgery, a variable free-running pulsed neodymium:yttrium-aluminum-garnet (Nd:YAG at 1064 nm wavelength) is used by a dentist or periodontist to treat the periodontal pocket. The laser is intended to selectively remove diseased or infected pocket epithelium from the underlying connective tissue. The Nd:YAG laser has been shown to reduce levels of microbial pathogens in periodontal pockets and vaporize the pocket-lining epithelium without causing damage to the underlying connective tissue.

Efficacy 
The use of lasers in treating periodontal disease has been seen by some dental professionals as controversial. The American Academy of Periodontology stated in 1999 that it was "not aware of any randomized blinded controlled longitudinal clinical trials, cohort or longitudinal studies, or case-controlled studies indicating that 'laser excisional new attachment procedure (or Laser ENAP)' or 'laser curettage' offers any advantageous clinical result not achieved by traditional periodontal therapy. Moreover, published studies suggest that use of lasers for ENAP procedures and/or gingival curettage could render root surfaces and adjacent alveolar bone incompatible with normal cell attachment and healing." A 2015 systematic review from the AAP regeneration workshop acknowledged more recent peer-reviewed studies showing periodontal regeneration, and further suggested that the LANAP protocol's minimally invasive nature may offer advantages in the regeneration of defects where minimal soft tissue change is required. The current AAP website indicates that lasers can be used to treat periodontal disease, and current controlled studies have shown that similar results have been found with the laser compared to specific other treatment options, including scaling and root planing alone. The website also states patients should be aware that different laser wavelengths have different applications in periodontal treatment.

As of October 2017 studies of lasers in the treatment of periodontitis have yet to provide sufficient evidence that the use of lasers provide benefit over traditional therapy. Compared to Scaling and root planing (S/RP), the LANAP protocol immediately suppresses red and orange complex periodontal pathogens.

In 2016, the FDA granted a new clearance of True Regeneration - the ability of the laser to regenerate alveolar bone, cementum, and periodontal ligaments when used with the LANAP protocol.

Benefits of laser gum disease surgery 
According to the Academy of General Dentistry (AGD), there are benefits to dental lasers including: reduce symptoms and healing times associated with traditional therapies; reduce the amount of bacteria in both diseased gum tissue and in tooth cavities; and control bleeding during surgery.

The 1064 Nd:YAG laser kills at least three different periodontal pathogens without harming normal tissues:  (Porphyromonas gingivalis (Pg) and Prevotella intermedia (Pi), and Candida albicans (Ca);  a pathogenic fungus. This unique aspect of laser irradiation to affect some tissue and not others is termed Selective Photoantisepsis, and is due to differential absorption between host tissue and pathogens.

Nd:YAG laser light treatment has shown a long-lasting effect on the shift of bacterial subgingival flora, decreasing pathogenic bacteria and creating an environment where normal flora survives.

See also

 List of laser articles

References

External links 
 Laser Assisted New Attachment Procedure in private practice (General Dentistry, September - October 2004, Vol 52, No. 5.)

Periodontology
Dental lasers